Abdul Matin (also spelled Abdul Mateen) may refer to:

 Abdul Matin (poet) (died 1938), poet, author, statesman, administrator
 A. T. M. Abdul Mateen (1925–2001), Bangladesh economist and politician
 Abdul Matin (detainee), high school science teacher who was held in Guantanamo for six years based on suspicions he was a Taliban leader
 Abdul Matin (Taliban leader) (c. 1960–2008), Taliban leader who was killed in combat in Kandahar
 Abdul Matin (language activist) (1926–2014), language activist in Bangladesh
 Abdul Matin, a pseudonym of Indonesian terrorism suspect Dulmatin (1970–2010)
 Abdul Matin Chaudhary (1895–1948), Bengali politician and minister
 Abdul Matin Chowdhury (1921–1981), Bangladeshi academic and physicist
 Abdul Matin Chowdhury (politician) (1944–2012), Bangladeshi politician
 Abdul Matin Chowdhury (scholar) (1915–1990), Bangladeshi religious scholar and political activist
 Abdul Matin (actor) (b.1980), a Nepalese actor
 Prince Mateen Bolkiah (b.1991), also known as Prince Abdul Mateen of Brunei